"Let's Do Something" is a song co-written and recorded by American country music artist Vince Gill.  It was released in September 1987 as the second single from the album The Way Back Home.  The song reached #16 on the Billboard Hot Country Singles & Tracks chart.  Gill wrote the song with Reed Nielsen.

Chart performance

References

1987 singles
1987 songs
Vince Gill songs
Songs written by Vince Gill
Songs written by Reed Nielsen
Song recordings produced by Richard Landis
RCA Records singles